Amarin Printing and Publishing Public Company Limited, branded as Amarin Group, is a Thai media company. It began doing business in 1976 with the Baan Lae Suan shelter magazine, and grew to become a major publisher of books and glossy magazines, including magazine titles such as Room, Praew, Cheewajit and National Geographic Thailand. It also has operations in book retail through its Naiin chain of bookstores, and branched into television with Amarin TV in 2012. The company was listed on the Stock Exchange of Thailand in 1993, but has been experiencing financial difficulties since the 2010s due to the changing media landscape. The Sirivadhanabhakdi family's Vadhanabhakdi Co., Ltd. bought into the company in 2016, and is now the majority shareholder at 60.35 percent.

References

External links

Mass media companies of Thailand
Publishing companies of Thailand
Companies based in Bangkok
Companies listed on the Stock Exchange of Thailand